The first series of The Great British Bake Off first aired on BBC Two on 17 August 2010. Ten home bakers took part in a bake-off to test their baking skills as they battled to be designated the best amateur baker.  Each week the programme bakers participated in three challenges in a particular discipline, with some being eliminated at the end of each episode.  The rounds of the competition took place in various locations across the UK following a theme, for example, the episode on puddings took place in Bakewell, bread baking would take place near Sandwich. This first series had a voiceover by Stephen Noonan; for the subsequent series this role was taken by the on-screen presenters Mel Giedroyc and Sue Perkins. The competition was won by Edd Kimber.

Bakers

Results summary 

Colour key:

Episodes

Episode 1: Cakes 
For the first challenge, the bakers were instructed to bake any cake they want using their creativity within three hours. It had to be evenly baked, evenly risen, and moist. For the technical challenge, the bakers were to make a Victoria Sandwich using Mary Berry's recipe. For the final challenge, the showstopper challenge, the bakers were required to make a Chocolate Celebration Cake, with perfect execution, original ideas and their own flair.

Cotswolds

Episode 2: Biscuits 
For the signature bake, the bakers were asked to bake their Personality Biscuits within two hours. For the technical challenge, the bakers were asked to bake scones using Paul Hollywood's recipe within an hour. For the showstopper, the bakers were asked to bake Petit Fours; Meringues, Choux Pastry, and Macarons, within four hours.

Scone Palace, Perthshire

Episode 3: Bread 
For their signature bake, the bakers were asked to bake their signature bread within  hours. For the technical challenge, the bakers were asked to bake a cob using Paul's recipe within  hours. For the showstopper, the bakers were asked to bake 12 sweet rolls and 12 savoury rolls. They had to bake 3 flavours of savoury rolls and 3 flavors of sweet rolls. They had 6 hours.

Sarre Windmill, Kent

Episode 4: Puddings 
For the first challenge, the bakers were asked to bake their own classic pudding, steamed or baked. They had  hours. For the technical challenge, the bakers were asked to bake 4 miniature lemon souffles using Mary's recipe within 40 minutes. The bakers started to bake at different time intervals. For the showstopper, the bakers were asked to bake 3 puddings: crumble, bread, and suet, in 5 hours.

Bakewell, Derbyshire

Episode 5: Pastry 
For the signature challenge, the bakers were asked to bake a savoury pie in  hours. For the technical challenge, the bakers were asked to bake 4 Cornish pasties in  hours. For the showstopper, the bakers were asked to bake 2 pastry platters; savory canapés and sweet tartlets, in 5 hours.

Mousehole, Cornwall

Episode 6: Tea Party (Final) 
In the final, a baker was eliminated after the first bake, and only two bakers competed in the final day. For the first challenge, the 3 finalists were asked to bake 24 professional tea cakes in  hours. For the final challenge, the 2 finalists were asked to bake 24 miniature tarts, 24 scones, 24 choux buns, and 24 finger sandwiches in 5 hours.

Fulham Palace, London

It took the judges nearly five hours to determine whom to eliminate, and had to look back at their performances over the series as a whole to make a decision. The idea of eliminating a contestant in the final was dropped from future series.

Post-show career

After winning the competition, Edd Kimber is able to make his living from baking. He worked in the pastry kitchen at Raymond Blanc's restaurant Le Manoir.  He has written three books on baking, The Boy Who Bakes, Say It With Cake, and Patisserie Made Simple: From Macaron to Millefeuille and More. He has taught macaron making classes in London, run a pop-up bakery in Fortnum & Mason, and appeared as a 'resident baker' on The Alan Titchmarsh Show.

Ruth Clemens has written a number of books on cake making and baking, including Busy Girls Guide to Cake Decorating, The Pink Whisk Guide to Cake Making, The Pink Whisk Guide to Baking and Creative Éclairs.

Miranda Gore Browne wrote a book, Biscuit, published on 5 April 2012. Her second book, Bake Me a Cake as Fast as You Can, was published in August 2014.

Jonathan Shepherd left his job in the pharmaceutical company and launched a new business, The Pudding Stop, in St Albans.  It started as a portable street-food vendor and a supplier of puddings to restaurants. Shepherd has since also opened a shop, also in St Albans.

Mark Whithers, who was eliminated in Episode 1, died on 11 May 2013 after suffering from cancer.

The Great British Wedding Cake
In this one-off special edition, the three finalists from series one (Edd, Ruth and Miranda) returned. Paul Hollywood and Mary Berry set them the challenge of making and baking two spectacular Wedding Cakes each in just sixteen hours, one being traditional and the other contemporary.
Paul and Mary explore the history of the Great British Wedding Cake, looking at the dramatic changes through the eras; from the Tudors and the Victorians, wartime Britain and the eighties to the present day.
Although Paul and Mary judged the results, no individual winner was declared.

Ratings
Official episode viewing figures are from BARB.

Specials

References

External links
 

Series 1
2010 British television seasons